Blekinge County held a regional council election on 9 September 2018 at the same time as the general and municipal elections.

Results
There were 57 seats, ten more than in 2014. The Social Democrats remained the largest party but suffered nearly seven points of a deficit from the 2014 results, going from 39.3% to 32.5%. In spite of this the increased numbers of seats meant the party remained at 19 seats. This was still a sizeably lower share. The Sweden Democrats recorded 20.6% and became the second largest party, while the Moderates made gains in spite of a nationwide drop.

Municipal results

Percentage

By votes

References

Elections in Blekinge County
Blekinge